Staryye Kiyeshki (İśke Qıyışqı) is a rural locality (a village) in Kabakovsky Selsoviet, Karmaskalinsky District, Bashkortostan, Russia. The population was 581 as of 2010. There are 46 streets.

Geography 
Staryye Kiyeshki is located 36 km northwest of Karmaskaly (the district's administrative centre) by road. Olkhovoye is the nearest rural locality.

References 

Rural localities in Karmaskalinsky District